"Full Force Gale" is a song written by Northern Irish singer-songwriter Van Morrison. It was included on his 1979 album Into the Music.

Recording and composition
"Full Force Gale" was recorded in spring, 1979 at the Record Plant Studios, Sausalito, California for the album Into the Music.

The song has a moderately fast 4/4 tempo. It is in the key of D major. The song's introduction uses the chords D–A–G–A–D–G–D–A, while the verses use the chord progression D–A–G–D–A–G–D–A–G–A–D–A. The bridge uses the progression Bm-G-A. The song features a slide guitar solo by Ry Cooder.

In the lyrics Morrison describes the feeling of encounters with "the Lord". Biographer Peter Mills said that "It is a physical effect – he is "lifted up again" as if by a natural force, the full-force gale being a simile for this: 'Like a full force gale'". Because of this Mills concluded that Into the Music has religious elements to it: "Into the Music is New Testament, dealing with forgiveness, love and kindness."

When biographer Steve Turner asked the singer about the theme of rebirth that occurs quite often in his songs, Morrison answered, "I wrote a song called 'Full Force Gale' in which I said 'No matter where I roam/I will find my way back home/I will always return to the Lord'. That answers it for me.  No matter what I might say at the present, that's my feeling about that."

Response
Record World said that "Van's stirring vocal has a great mate in the person of Toni Marcus and her heavenly electric violin."

Allmusic's reviewer, P.G. Ward, calls it: "Essentially a brisk pop tune, Morrison sings it with great fervour  and commitment, delivering simple couplets such as  'In the gentle evening breeze/In the whispering shady trees/I will find my sanctuary in the Lord' with immense skill.  The arrangement is also magnificent, with the fiddle part a particular joy..." He goes on to say: "Into the Music is one of Van Morrison's finest albums, and 'Full Force Gale' is arguably its finest track."

As described by Brian Hinton, "'Full Force Gale' has the cheerful punch of the best gospel singing, and sees Van 'lifted up by the Lord' ... as with Wordsworth, the divine is perceived not through religious teachings but through nature ... "

Appearance on other albums
"Full Force Gale" is also featured on the 1990 compilation album The Best of Van Morrison.
A live version appeared on the 1984 CD Live at the Grand Opera House Belfast.
This song is one of the hits re-mastered in 2007 and included on the compilation album, Still on Top - The Greatest Hits.

Personnel
Van Morrison: vocal, guitar
Herbie Armstrong: guitar
Ry Cooder: slide guitar
Pee Wee Ellis: tenor saxophone
David Hayes: bass
Mark Isham: trumpet
Mark Jordan: piano
Toni Marcus:  violin
Katie Kissoon: backing vocals
Peter Van Hooke: drums

Covers
Elvis Costello – his version appears on the 1994 tribute album, No Prima Donna: The Songs of Van Morrison and also on Costello's own 1995 album, Kojak Variety.

Notes

References
Hinton, Brian (1997). Celtic Crossroads: The Art of Van Morrison, Sanctuary, 
Heylin, Clinton (2003), Can You Feel the Silence? Van Morrison: A New Biography, London: Viking, 
Mills, Peter (2010), Hymns to the Silence: Inside the Words and Music of Van Morrison, London: Continuum, 
Turner, Steve (1993). Van Morrison: Too Late to Stop Now, Viking Penguin, 
Van Morrison Anthology, London: Wise Publications,

External links
[ "Full Force Gale" allmusic review]

Van Morrison songs
1979 singles
Songs written by Van Morrison
1979 songs
Song recordings produced by Van Morrison
Warner Records singles